Indian Orchard may refer to:
 Indian Orchard, Springfield, Massachusetts, a neighborhood in Springfield, Massachusetts
 Indian Orchard, a village in Texas Township, Wayne County, Pennsylvania
 The Indian Orchard Branch Library, a historic landmark in Indian Orchard, Massachusetts